Harry Hampton (1773 – 12 November 1845) was an English professional cricketer who played during the early 19th century.

Hampton was born in Surrey in 1773. He made his first-class cricket debut in 1800 for a Surrey XI in 1800 and went on to make a total of six appearances in first-class matches, his last coming in 1811.

Hampton died at Peckham, then in Surrey, in 1845.

References

English cricketers
English cricketers of 1787 to 1825
Kent cricketers
Year of birth unknown
Year of death unknown
1773 births